Gilman Warren Rankin (April 17, 1911 – October 31, 1993) was an American film and television actor. He was known for playing Deputy Charlie Riggs in the first season of the American western television series Tombstone Territory, and for playing Woodsy Niles in the 1969 film Midnight Cowboy.

Life and career
Rankin was born in Boston, Massachusetts. He began his career in 1949, first appearing in the film Bride of Vengeance, where he played the uncredited role of a scout. He continued his career mainly appearing in film and television programs for which he played the role of Deputy Charlie Riggs in the western television series Tombstone Territory, in which Rankin only appeared in its first season.

Later in his career, Rankin appeared in television programs including Gunsmoke, The Adventures of Kit Carson, Cheyenne, Two Faces West, Tales of Wells Fargo, Riverboat,  State Trooper, The Life and Legend of Wyatt Earp, My Three Sons, Perry Mason and Shotgun Slade. He also appeared in films such as, Midnight Cowboy, Fort Algiers, Roar of the Crowd, The Greatest Show on Earth, Ghost Town and Black Patch. Rankin's last credit was in the film Assault on Precinct 13.

Rankin died in October 1993 in Orange County, California, at the age of 82.

References

External links 

Rotten Tomatoes profile

1911 births
1993 deaths
People from Boston
Male actors from Boston
American male film actors
American male television actors
20th-century American male actors
Western (genre) television actors